John Andrew (born 6 May 1993) is an Irish professional rugby union player who currently plays for Ulster as a hooker.

Born in Ballymena, he was part of the Ballymena Academy team that won the Ulster Schools' Cup in 2010. He represented Ireland at under-19 level, and was part of the Ireland squad for the 2013 Six Nations Under 20s Championship, making one start and four appearances from the bench. He came through the Ulster academy system, made his first senior appearance for the province in a friendly against Exeter in August 2014, and signed a development contract in March 2015, and a full senior contract in April 2017. He made his first competitive senior appearance against Ospreys in September 2015, Primarily a backup to Rory Best, and later Rob Herring, he had a strong season in 2020–21, making more appearances than usual and scoring seven tries. He signed a contract extension in January 2021.

References

External links
United Rugby Championship profile

ItsRugby profile

1993 births
Living people
Irish rugby union players
Rugby union hookers
Rugby union players from Ballymena
Ulster Rugby players